Redirector may refer to:

 Network redirector, provide access to file systems and printers on other computers on a network
 COM port redirector, relay serial data between a "virtual" COM port and a serial device server or modem server on a network
 URL redirection, URLs rewritten prior to processing by a web server

See also
 
 
 Redirect (disambiguation)